An avalanche transistor is a bipolar junction transistor designed for operation in the region of its collector-current/collector-to-emitter voltage characteristics beyond the collector-to-emitter breakdown voltage, called avalanche breakdown region.  This region is characterized by avalanche breakdown, which is a phenomenon similar to Townsend discharge for gases, and negative differential resistance. Operation in the avalanche breakdown region is called avalanche-mode operation: it gives avalanche transistors the ability to switch very high currents with less than a nanosecond rise and fall times (transition times). Transistors not specifically designed for the purpose can have reasonably consistent avalanche properties; for example 82% of samples of the 15V high-speed switch 2N2369, manufactured over a 12-year period, were capable of generating avalanche breakdown pulses with rise time of 350 ps or less, using a 90V power supply as Jim Williams writes.

History
The paper describes how to use alloy-junction transistors in the avalanche breakdown region in order to overcome speed and breakdown voltage limitations which affected the first models of such kind of transistor when used in earlier computer digital circuits. Therefore, the very first applications of avalanche transistors were in switching circuits and multivibrators. The introduction of the avalanche transistor served also as an application of Miller's empirical formula for the avalanche multiplication coefficient , first introduced in the paper . The need for better understanding transistor behavior in the avalanche breakdown region,
not only for use in avalanche mode, gave rise to an extensive research on impact ionization in semiconductors (see ).

From the beginning of the 1960s to the first half of the 1970s, several avalanche-transistor circuits were proposed. The kind of bipolar junction transistor best suited for use in the avalanche breakdown region was studied.

Linear applications of this class of devices started later since there are some requirements to fulfill, as described below. The use of avalanche transistors in those applications is not mainstream since the devices require high collector to emitter voltages in order to work properly.

Nowadays, there is still active research on avalanche devices (transistors or other) made of compound semiconductors, capable of switching currents of several tens of amperes even faster than "traditional" avalanche transistors.

Basic theory

Static avalanche region characteristics 

In this section, the  static characteristic of an avalanche transistor is calculated. For the sake of simplicity, only an NPN device is considered: however, the same results are valid for PNP devices only changing signs to voltages and currents accordingly.
Since avalanche breakdown multiplication is present only across the collector-base junction, the first step of the calculation is to determine collector current as a sum of various component currents though the collector since only those fluxes of charge are subject to this phenomenon. Kirchhoff's current law applied to a bipolar junction transistor implies the following relation, always satisfied by the collector current 

while for the same device working in the active region, basic transistor theory gives the following relation

where
 is the base current,
 is the collector-base reverse leakage current,
 is the emitter current,
 is the common emitter current gain of the transistor.
Equating the two formulas for  gives the following result

and since  is the common base current gain of the transistor, then

When avalanche effects in a transistor collector are considered, the collector current  is given by

where  is Miller's avalanche multiplication coefficient. It is the most important parameter in avalanche mode operation: its expression is the following

where
 is the collector-base breakdown voltage,
 is a constant depending on the semiconductor used for the construction of the transistor and doping profile of the collector-base junction,
 is the collector-base voltage.

and remembering that  and  where  is the base-emitter voltage

since : this is the expression of the parametric family of the collector characteristics  with parameter . Note that  increases without limit if

where  is the collector-emitter breakdown voltage.

Differential dynamical model

The differential dynamical mode described here, also called the small signal model, is the only intrinsic small signal model of the avalanche transistor. Stray elements due to the package enclosing the transistor are deliberately neglected, since their analysis would not add anything useful from the point of view of the working principles of the avalanche transistor. However, when realizing an  electronic circuit, those parameters are of great importance. Particularly, stray inductances in series with collector and emitter leads have to be minimized to preserve the high speed performance of avalanche transistor circuits. Also, this equivalent circuit is useful when describing the behavior of the avalanche transistor near its turn on time, where collector currents and voltages are still near their quiescent values: in the real circuit it permits the calculation of time constants and therefore rise and fall times of the  waveform. However, since avalanche transistor switching circuits are intrinsically large signal circuits, the only way to predict with reasonable accuracy their real behaviour is to do numerical simulations.

An avalanche transistor operated by a common bias network is shown in the adjacent picture:  can be zero or positive value, while  can be short circuited. In every avalanche transistor circuit, the output signal is taken from the collector or the emitter: therefore the small-signal differential model of an avalanche transistor working in the avalanche region is always seen from the collector-emitter output pins, and consist of a parallel  circuit as shown in the adjacent picture, which includes only bias components.
The magnitude and sign of both those parameters are controlled by the base current : since both base-collector and base-emitter junctions are inversely biased in the quiescent state, the equivalent circuit of the base input is simply a current generator shunted by base-emitter and base-collector junction capacitances and is therefore not analyzed in what follows.
The intrinsic time constant of the basic equivalent small signal circuit has the following value

where
 is the collector-emitter avalanche differential resistance and, as stated above, can be obtained by differentiation of the collector-emitter voltage  respect to the collector current , for a constant base current 

 is the collector-emitter avalanche differential capacitance and has the following expression

where
 is the current gain angular cutoff frequency
 is the common base output capacitance
The two parameters are both negative. This means that if the collector load const of an ideal current source, the circuit is unstable. This is the theoretical justification of the astable multivibrator behavior of the circuit when the  voltage is raised over some critical level.

Second breakdown avalanche mode
When the collector current rises above the data sheet limit  a new breakdown mechanism become important: the second breakdown. This phenomenon is caused by excessive heating of some points (hot spots) in the base-emitter region of the bipolar junction transistor, which give rise to an exponentially increasing current through these points: this exponential rise of current in turn gives rise to even more overheating, originating a positive thermal feedback mechanism. While analyzing the  static characteristic, the presence of this phenomenon is seen as a sharp collector voltage drop and a corresponding almost vertical rise of the collector current. At the present, it is not possible to produce a transistor without hot spots and thus without second breakdown, since their presence is related to the technology of refinement of silicon. During this process, very small but finite quantities of metals remain in localized portions of the wafer: these particles of metals became deep centers of recombination, i.e. centers where current exists in a preferred way. While this phenomenon is destructive for Bipolar junction transistors working in the usual way, it can be used to push-up further the current and voltage limits of a device working in avalanche mode by limiting its time duration: also, the switching speed of the device is not negatively affected. A clear description of avalanche transistor circuits working in second breakdown regime together with some examples can be found in the paper .

Numerical simulations
Avalanche transistor circuits are intrinsically large signal circuits, so small signal models, when applied to such circuits, can only give a qualitative description. To obtain more accurate information about the behavior of time dependent voltages and currents in such circuits it is necessary to use numerical analysis. The "classical" approach, detailed in the paper  which relies upon the book , consists in considering the circuits as a system of nonlinear ordinary differential equations and solve it by a numerical method implemented by a general purpose numerical simulation software: results obtained in this way are fairly accurate and simple to obtain. However, these methods rely on the use of analytical transistor models best suited for the analysis of the breakdown region: those models are not necessarily suited to describe the device working in all possible regions. A more modern approach is to use the common analog circuit simulator SPICE together with an advanced transistor model supporting avalanche breakdown simulations, which the basic SPICE transistor model does not. Examples of such models are described in the paper  and in the paper : the latter is a description of the Mextram model, currently used by some semiconductor industries to characterize their bipolar junction transistors.

A graphical method
A graphical method for studying the behavior of an avalanche transistor was proposed in references  and : the method was first derived in order to plot the static behavior of the device and then was applied also to solve problems concerning the dynamic behavior. The method bears the spirit of the graphical methods used to design tube and transistor circuits directly from the characteristic diagrams given in data sheets by producers.

Applications
Avalanche transistors are mainly used as fast pulse generators, having rise and fall times of less than a nanosecond and high output voltage and current. They are occasionally used as amplifiers in the microwave frequency range, even if this use is not mainstream: when used for this purpose, they are called "Controlled Avalanche Transit-time Triodes" (CATTs).

Avalanche mode switching circuits
Avalanche mode switching relies on avalanche multiplication of current flowing through the collector-base junction as a result of impact ionization of the atoms in the semiconductor crystal lattice. Avalanche breakdown in semiconductors has found application in switching circuits for two basic reasons
it can provide very high switching speeds, since current builds-up in very small times, in the picosecond range, due to avalanche multiplication.
It can provide very high output currents, since large currents can be controlled by very small ones, again due to avalanche multiplication.
The two circuits considered in this section are the simplest examples of avalanche transistor circuits for switching purposes: both the examples detailed are monostable multivibrators.

Most circuits employing an avalanche transistor are activated by the following two different kinds of input:

Collector triggering input circuit: the input trigger signal is fed to the collector via a fast switching diode , possibly after being shaped by a pulse shaping network. This way of driving an avalanche transistor was extensively employed in first generation circuits since the collector node has a high impedance and also collector capacitance  behaves quite linearly under large signal regime. As a consequence of this, the delay time from input to output is very small and approximately independent of the value of control voltage. However, this trigger circuit requires a diode capable of resist to high reverse voltages and switch very fast, characteristics that are very difficult to realize in the same diode, therefore it is rarely seen in modern avalanche transistor circuits.
Base triggering input circuit: the input trigger signal is fed directly to the base via a fast switching diode , possibly after being shaped by a pulse shaping network. This way of driving an avalanche transistor was relatively less employed in first generation circuits because the base node has a relatively low impedance and an input capacitance  which is highly nonlinear (as a matter of fact, it is exponential) under the large signal regime: this causes a fairly large, input voltage dependent, delay time, which was analyzed in detail in the paper . However, the required inverse voltage for the feed diode is far lower respect diodes to be used in collector trigger input circuits, and since ultra fast Schottky diodes are easily and cheaply found, this is the driver circuit employed in most modern avalanche transistor circuit. This is also the reason why the diode  in the following applicative circuits is symbolized as a Schottky diode.

Avalanche transistor can also be triggered by lowering the emitter voltage , but this configuration is rarely seen in the literature and in practical circuits.: in reference , paragraph 3.2.4 "Trigger circuits" one such configuration is described, where the avalanche transistor is used itself as a part of the trigger circuit of a complex pulser, while in reference  a balanced level discriminator where a common bipolar junction transistor is emitter-coupled to an avalanche transistor is briefly described.

The two avalanche pulser described below are both base triggered and have two outputs. Since the device used is an NPN transistor,  is a positive going output while  is a negative going output: using a PNP transistor reverses the polarities of outputs. Resistor  recharges the capacitor  or the transmission line  (i.e. the energy storage components) after commutation. It has usually a high resistance to limit the static collector current, so the recharging process is slow. Sometimes this resistor is replaced by an electronic circuit which is capable of charging faster the energy storage components. However this kind of circuit usually is patented so they are rarely found in mainstream application circuits.

Capacitor discharge avalanche pulser: a trigger signal applied to the base lead of the avalanche transistor cause the avalanche breakdown between the collector and emitter lead. The capacitor  starts to be discharged by a current flowing through the resistors  and : the voltages across those resistors are the output voltages. The current waveform is not a simple RC discharge current but has a complex behavior which depends on the avalanche mechanism: however it has a very fast rise time, of the order of fractions of a nanosecond. Peak current depends on the size of the capacitor : when its value is raised over a few hundred picofarads, transistor goes into second breakdown avalanche mode, and peak currents reach values of several amperes.
Transmission line avalanche pulser: a trigger signal applied to the base lead of the avalanche transistor cause the avalanche breakdown between the collector and emitter lead. The fast rise time of the collector current generates a current pulse of approximatively the same amplitude, which propagates along the transmission line. The pulse reaches the open circuited end of the line after the characteristic delay time  of the line has elapsed, and then is reflected backward. As a consequence of this traveling wave behavior, the current flowing through the avalanche transistor has a rectangular shape of duration

In practical designs, an adjustable impedance like a two terminal Zobel network (or simply a trimmer capacitor) is placed from the collector of the avalanche transistor to ground, giving the transmission line pulser the ability to reduce ringing and other undesired behavior on the output voltages.

It is possible to turn those circuits into astable multivibrators by removing their trigger input circuits and
raising their power supply voltage  until a relaxation oscillation begins, or
connecting the base resistor  to a positive base bias voltage  and thus forcibly starting avalanche breakdown and associated relaxation oscillation.
A well-detailed example of the first procedure is described in reference . It is also possible to realize avalanche mode bistable multivibrators, but their use is not as common as other types described of multivibrators, one important reason being that they require two avalanche transistors, one working continuously in avalanche breakdown regime, and this can give serious problems from the point of view of power dissipation and device operating life.

A practical, easily realised, and inexpensive application is the generation of fast-rising pulses for checking equipment rise time.

The controlled avalanche transit-time triode (CATT)
Avalanche mode amplification relies on avalanche multiplication as avalanche mode switching. However, for this mode of operation, it is necessary that Miller's avalanche multiplication coefficient  be kept almost constant for large output voltage swings: if this condition is not fulfilled, significant amplitude distortion arises on the output signal. Consequently,

avalanche transistors used for application in switching circuits cannot be used since Miller's coefficient varies widely with the collector to emitter voltage
the operating point of the device cannot be in the negative resistance of the avalanche breakdown region for the same reason

These two requirements imply that a device used for amplification need a physical structure different from that of a typical avalanche transistor. The Controlled Avalanche Transit-time Triode (CATT), designed for microwave amplification, has a quite large lightly-doped region between the base and the collector regions, giving the device a collector-emitter breakdown voltage  fairly high compared to bipolar transistors of the same geometry. The current amplification mechanism is the same of the avalanche transistor, i.e. carrier generation by impact ionization, but there is also a transit-time effect as in IMPATT and  TRAPATT diodes, where a high-field region travels along the avalanching junction, precisely in along the intrinsic region. The device structure and choice of bias point imply that

Miller's avalanche multiplication coefficient M is limited to about 10.
The transit-time effect keeps this coefficient almost constant and independent of the collector-to-emitter voltage.

The theory for this kind of avalanche transistor is described completely in the paper , which also shows that this semiconductor device structure is well suited for microwave power amplification. It can deliver several watts of radio frequency power at a frequency of several gigahertz and it also has a control terminal, the base. However, it is not widely used since it requires voltages exceeding 200 volts to work properly, while gallium arsenide or other compound semiconductor FETs deliver a similar performance while being easier to work with. A similar device structure, proposed more or less in the same period in the paper , was the IMPISTOR, being a transistor with IMPATT collector-base junction.

See also
Avalanche diode

Notes

References
. A clear description of avalanche transistor circuits working in the second breakdown region (restricted access): however, a copy from the author's website is available here.
. The first article describing the working principles and potential applications of the CATT (restricted access).
. Sections 3.1.5 "Avalanche transistors", 3.2 and 3.4 "Trigger circuits containing avalanche transistors".
. Mainly sections 6.9, 6.10, 12.10, 13,16, 13.17.
. Chapter 9 "Avalanche mode switching".
The ZTX413 Avalanche Transistor Zetex Semiconductor Design Note 24, October 1995.
The ZTX413 Avalanche Transistor Zetex Semiconductor Data Sheet, March 1994. 
The ZTX415 Avalanche Mode Transistor Zetex Semiconductors Application Note 8, January 1996.

Bibliography
. The first paper analyzing the use of bipolar junction transistors in the avalanche region.
. A paper containing an accurate analysis of the avalanche breakdown phenomenon in planar pn-junctions, as those found in almost all modern transistors.
. The paper where the above formula for the avalanche multiplication coefficient M first appeared (restricted access).
 (Zipped djvu format). "Avalanche transistors and their application in pulse circuits" is a very scarce book worth a look, especially for the Russian reader: in-dept coverage of the theory of avalanche transistor, analysis of practical circuits, and a rich bibliography of 125 titles.
. "Avalanche transistors and tyristors. Theory and applications": a recent book on the same subject.

External links

Theory 
. A paper proposing and describing the IMPISTOR, a semiconductor device similar to the CATT.
. A paper analyzing the volt-amperometric characteristic of diodes and transistors using the computer algebra program Mathematica.
. A paper about the design of an avalanche transistor relaxation oscillator using the computer algebra program Mathematica
. A brief description of the basic physical principles of avalanche transistor circuits: instructive and interesting but "restricted access".
. A theoretical study of the stability of a transistor biased in the avalanche region (restricted access).
 available from the U.S. Department of Energy Office of Scientific & Technical Information. A report describing a transistor model capable of including avalanche effects in SPICE simulations.
. A paper describing the Mextram SPICE model from the point of view of avalanche behavior simulation. For a free copy found in the Mextram home page of NXP see here.
. A paper describing a transistor model for bipolar circuit simulation including avalanche effects (restricted access).
Jochen Riks "Avalanche-Transistor" (in German). A brief description of the working principles of the avalanche transistor, part of the course "Impulsschaltungen F-Praktikum EXP 10", June 1996, Fachschaft Physik Uni Düsseldorf.
. A paper proposing a graphical method to plot the static characteristic of an avalanche transistor (restricted access).
. A paper pushing further the study of avalanche transistor by a graphical method proposed in the preceding work (restricted access).
. A paper analyzing the trigger delay time of avalanche transistors by means of numerical analysis (restricted access).
. A paper where an analytical model of the behavior of an avalanche transistor is derived after suitable approximations (restricted access).

Applications
. A paper describing a fast sweep generator for a streak camera constructed using series connected avalanche transistor circuits.
. A paper describing an application of avalanche transistors to the design of a sampling oscilloscope: available abstract, full paper is "restricted access".
. Available from the U.S. Department of Energy Office of Scientific & Technical Information. A report describing the design of a driver for Pockels cells Q-switches.
. A project, inspired to Jim Williams' Linear Technology application notes AN72 and AN94, of an avalanche transistor astable multivibrator with schematics, waveforms and photos of the layout.
. Academic Dissertation presented with the assent of the Faculty of Technology. A doctoral dissertation describing a Laser TOF (Time Of Flight) Radar and its construction using an avalanche transistor pulser.
 (preprint version here). A paper describing an avalanche transistor pulser and its use as Laser driver in a laser radar.
NXP Mextram home page A very rich repository of documents about the Mextram bipolar junction transistor SPICE model, capable of avalanche breakdown behavior simulation.
"Operating the pulsed laser diode SPL LLxx", "Range finding using pulsed laser diodes" OSRAM Opto Semiconductors GmbH Application Notes, 2004-09-10. Two application notes from Osram Opto Semiconductors describing pulsed operation of a Laser diode, using avalanche transistors and other kind of drivers.
. A paper describing a method to enhance performances of banks of series-connected avalanche transistor circuits.
 (for a PDF copy, see here). A detailed paper describing the construction and performance of an avalanche transistor pre-trigger pulse generator to test the slew-rate of very fast operational amplifiers. Also appeared under the title "Slew Rate Verification for Wideband Amplifiers - The Taming of the Slew", application note AN94, Linear Technology, May 2003. See also, from the same author, Linear Technology application note AN47, High speed amplifier techniques", August 1991, where an astable circuit similar to that described by Holme is detailed in appendix D, pages 93–95.

Varia
R. Jacob Baker Academic Web Page at University of Nevada, Las Vegas. A contributor to the theory and applications of avalanche transistors.
Владимир Павлович Дьяконов (Vladimir Pavlovich D'yakonov) (in Russian). Some biographical notes about one of the leading contributors to the theory and application of avalanche transistors.
Ari Kilpelä Academic Web Page at the University of Oulu. A researcher working on theory and applications of avalanche transistor circuits.

Transistor types